The 2022 Taça de Portugal Final was the last match of the 2021–22 Taça de Portugal, which decided the winner of the 82nd season of the Taça de Portugal, the premier knockout cup competition in Portuguese football. It was played at the Estádio Nacional in Oeiras, between Primeira Liga sides Porto and Tondela.

Tondela qualified for the first time in its history to the Portuguese Cup final after beating second-tier side Mafra in the semi-finals. Porto return to dispute its 32nd final, two years after winning the 2020 final over Benfica.
The defending champions Braga were knocked out in the fifth round by Vizela.

Route to the final

Note: H = home fixture, A = away fixture

Match

Details

Post-match
The winners qualify for the 2022–23 UEFA Europa League group stage and play the 2022 Supertaça Cândido de Oliveira against the 2021–22 Primeira Liga winners. As Porto secured qualification to the 2022–23 UEFA Champions League by league ranking, the cup winner's place in the Europa League was thus transferred to the league's fourth-placed team, Braga. Consequently, the league's fifth- and sixth-placed teams, Gil Vicente and Vitória de Guimarães, qualified instead for the 2022–23 UEFA Europa Conference League third and second qualifying rounds, respectively.
As Porto also won the league title, they will play the 2022 Supertaça match against the cup runners-up, Tondela.

Notes

References

2022
2021–22 in Portuguese football
May 2022 sports events in Portugal
FC Porto matches
C.D. Tondela matches